Funda Arar (born 8 April 1975) is a Turkish singer.

Funda Arar spent her early childhood in Ankara, where she was born, and later in Muğla and Adapazarı. She studied at Istanbul Technical University's music conservatory, specialicizing in the mandolin. Her first album Sevgilerde came out in 1999, became a big hit, especially the song "Aysel". Sevgiliye was released a year later and included hits like "Seni Düşünürüm" and "Cesminaz" in collaboration with Kıraç. Alagül and Sevda Yanığı, her third and fourth albums came out in 2002 and 2003, which had the songs "Haberin Var mı?", "Aşksız Kal".

Arar's album Son Dans was released in December 2005 following a long break. Recently, she released the much anticipated Rüya (2008) (Turkish classical music), in which she sang songs in a variety of makams such as Hicaz, Rast, Hüzzam, Muhayyerkürdî, Uşşak, Kürdîlihicazkâr, and Nihavend. In this album, she was accompanied by a master ensemble of (Turkish classical music) under the directorship of Yaşar Okyay.

She is married with Febyo Taşel since 2004 who is also producer of all of her albums. In 2013, they had a child named Aras.

Discography

Studio albums 
 2000: Sevgilerde
 2002: Alagül 
 2003: Sevda Yanığı 
 2006: Son Dans (Mü-Yap certification: Platinum)
 2008: Rüya
 2009: Zamanın Eli
 2011: Aşkın Masum Çocukları
 2012: Sessiz Sinema
 2015: Hoşgeldin
 2017: Aşk Hikayesi
 2018: Arabesk

EPs 
 2001: Sevgiliye (with Kıraç)
 2007: Beyaz Gelincik (with Kıraç)
 2020: Doldur Yüreğimi
 2022: Boşver

Charts

Filmography

Television programs 
 Funda Arar'la Performans (2005)
 Gölgeler (2006) 
 Söz Müzik Funda Arar'' (2008–2009)

References

External links

 

1975 births
Living people
Istanbul Technical University alumni
Musicians from Ankara
21st-century Turkish singers
21st-century Turkish women singers
Golden Butterfly Award winners